Sweden took part in the Korean War by providing the Swedish Red Cross Field Hospital and participating in the Neutral Nations Supervisory Commission.

The Swedish Red Cross Field Hospital was the name given to the Swedish mission sent to Korea to deal with the humanitarian situation created by the Korean War, 1950-3. Following the temporary resolution of the war in 1953, Sweden was heavily involved in maintaining the armistice through its position in the Neutral Nations Supervisory Commission.

Swedish Red Cross Field Hospital

Following the North Korean invasion of the South, the UN Security Council adopted a resolution asking all UN member states to support South Korea. The Swedish government responded on July 14, 1950 by authorizing the dispatch of a 200-bed mobile field hospital. Shortly before his death, King Gustaf V announced that the Swedish state would cover the Hospital's expenses.

The Swedish Hospital arrived in Korea on September 23, 1950. Deciding that a 400-bed (stationary) Evacuation Hospital would be more valuable than a smaller but more mobile Field Hospital, the Swedish Hospital was converted and moved to the compound of the Commercial Middle School in Pusan where it remained until 1958.

Containing 400 beds throughout much of the duration of the conflict, the hospital was expanded to 600 beds by the end of the war, staffed by 174 Swedish doctors and nurses at any one time, all belonging to the Swedish Red Cross. 

After the ceasefire in 1953, the Swedish hospital stayed comparatively unchanged as a civilian hospital until it was closed in April 1957. A small advisory group from Sweden stayed in Korea to advise on medical practices (known as the 'Scandinavian training hospital') until Autumn 1958. 

Over the duration of the conflict 1,124 Swedish men and women served in the Swedish hospital and 19,100 United Nations personnel and 2,400 Korean personnel were treated by Swedish doctors.

Neutral Nations Supervisory Commission
Because of Sweden's reputation for neutrality during the major 20th century conflicts (First World, Second World and Korean Wars), Sweden was included as one of the four founding members of the Neutral Nations Supervisory Commission and several Swedish military personnel served in Korea enforcing the Panmunjom armistice.

After the War 
Sweden was the first Western European country to establish diplomatic relations and an embassy in North Korea.

References

External links
Embassy of Sweden in Seoul, Sweden-Republic of Korea: 50 Years of Diplomatic Relations
Medical assistance of Swedish Red Cross Field Hospital in Busan during and after the Korean war
Contribution from three Scandinavian countries During 1950 - 1969, ksfn.or.kr

United Nations contingents in Korea
Korean War